This is a list of individuals who were former or serving Members of Parliament for the House of Commons of the United Kingdom who died in the 1990s.

1990

1991

1992

1993

1994

1995

1996

1997

1998

1999

See also 

 List of United Kingdom MPs who died in the 2000s
 List of United Kingdom MPs who died in the 2010s
 List of United Kingdom MPs who died in the 2020s

Died in the 1990s
1990s politics-related lists